Acta Asiatica Varsoviensia is an academic journal published by the Institute of Mediterranean and Oriental Cultures of the Polish Academy of Sciences (until 2010 the Centre for Studies on Non-European Countries). Initially the journal was published in the Polish language, with article summaries written in English. Since the 13th issue, the journal was published in English, with occasional articles in French and German. 

The journal is issued since the year 1988. The position of the chief editor between the years 1988 and 2014 was occupied by professor Roman Sławiński. In the year 2015, the chief editor was professor Jerzy Zdanowski. During the year 2016, the chief editor of the journal was professor Krzysztof Trzciński. The editor-in-chief is Małgorzata Wielińska-Soltwedel.

The journal was initially published by Wydawnictwo Naukowe Semper. The issues 11-28 were released by Wydawnictwo Naukowe Askon. Since the volume 29 (2016), the journal has been published by Polish Academy of Sciences and Cultivate Foundation.

Abstracting and indexing 
The journal is abstracted and indexed in:
 Scopus
 Worldwide Political Science Abstracts
 Historical Abstracts
 SCImago
 Directory of Open Access Journals

References

External links
 
 Acta Asiatica Varsoviensia in the index CEJSH
 Acta Asiatica Varsoviensia in ERIH PLUS
 Website of the Institute of Mediterranean and Oriental Cultures
 Cultivate Foundation

English-language journals
Asian studies journals
Cultural journals
Annual journals
Publications established in 1988
Polish Academy of Sciences academic journals